Yan Ding, courtesy name Taichen, was a military general of the Jin dynasty (266–420). At the time of the Disaster of Yongjia in 311, Yan Ding brought the nephew of Emperor Huai, Sima Ye, to Chang'an, where a group of loyalists from Anding (安定, present-day Zhenyuan, Gansu) were in the process of retaking the region from Han Zhao forces. After the re-establishment of the Jin government, Yan Ding became a powerful member of the new regime but jealousy and suspicion would cut his career short as his peers Qu Yun and Suo Chen combined their forces to have him killed.

Life 
Yan Ding was from Tianshui Commandary and once served the emperor's regent, Sima Yue as his Army Advisor. He managed to reach the office of Inspector of Yuzhou later in his career but had to resign due to his mother passing away. He gathered a thousand refugees in Mi County who wished to follow him back to his home, but before he could leave, the emperor's nephew, Sima Ye arrived at the county. Luoyang had been captured by Han Zhao, and Emperor Huai was being held captive. Sima Ye's minister, Xun Fan established a provisional government at the county, although he later moved it to Xuchang and Yingchuan to distance themselves from the enemies.  

Yan Ding remained in Mi County and through the support of other ministers who had fled the capital's region, Xun Fan was persuaded to make Yan the Champion General and Inspector of Yuzhou. News of resistance in Chang'an headed by Jia Ya reached Mi County in 311, and Yan Ding was set on bringing the emperor over to the group. With encouragement from the Prefect of Heyin (河陰, in modern Luoyang, Henan), Fu Chang (傅暢), he began his preparations. However, ministers such as Xun Fan and Zhou Yi were against this, typically because most of them did not want to abandon their homes in the east. Yan Ding hunted them down with mixed results as they fled from his group.

Yan Ding began his journey at Wan, but before he went to Chang'an, he decided to make a stop of Luoyang despite Han Zhao's occupation. He wanted to pay respects to the imperial tombs and perhaps gather more refugees to expand his follower. Naturally, many believed this to be a bad idea as Han Zhao forces would very likely attack them. Yan Ding ignored their concerns and set out with the emperor but encountered bandits at Shangluo along the way. Hundreds of his followers were killed while some chose to abandon the group. Regardless, Yan Ding regrouped his remaining forces and proceeded to Lantian. Once there, he sent a message to Jia Ya stating his arrival and Jia Ya brought the emperor and his followers to safety.

Chang'an would be liberated by Jia Ya the following year. Sima Ye was declared the new Crown Prince and Yan Ding was made the Chief of Affairs to the Crown Prince, wielding significant power over the new government. Despite that, he was not content with what he had and wanted to spread his influence to Jingzhao, held by its Administrator, Liang Zong (梁綜). He and Liang battled one another, and Yan Ding killed Liang Zong in the end. 

His peers, Qu Yun and Suo Chen felt uncomfortable with his growing influence. They banded together, and used Liang Zong's death as a pretext for attacking him. They were joined by Liang Zong's brothers, Liang Wei (梁緯) and Liang Su (梁肅). Yan Ding was driven away and fled to Yong, but he was killed by a Di tribesman named Dou Shou (竇首). With Yan Ding and Liang Zong dead, and Jia Ya losing his life in a skirmish around the same time, Qu Yun and Suo Chen would fill the power vacuum, controlling the emperor until their downfall in 316.

References 

 Fang, Xuanling (ed.) (648). Book of Jin (Jin Shu).
 Sima, Guang (1084). Zizhi Tongjian

312 deaths
Jin dynasty (266–420) generals